Theatre District–Convention Center station (sometimes stylized and abbrivated as Theatre District•Convention Cntr) is an light rail station in Denver, Colorado, United States. It is served by the D and H Lines, operated by the Regional Transportation District (RTD), and was opened on November 28, 2004. It is located on Stout Street, between Speer Boulevard and 14th Street, located under the Colorado Convention Center and also close to the Denver Performing Arts Complex.

The station opened in 2004 to replace the 14th & Stout station and 14th & California station, which were used for southbound and northbound trips on the D Line, respectively. These original stations were opened with the rest of the Central Corridor in 1994.

Theatre District/Convention Center was one of the first stations on Denver's light rail system with a 4-car platform.  As part of the FasTracks plan that was approved by voters in 2004, most light rail stations in Denver have been upgraded to 4-car platforms. From 2004 to 2009, the station was known as Convention Center-Performing Arts station.

References

RTD light rail stations in Denver
Railway stations in the United States opened in 2004